The  Ministry of Education is the Iraq government agency responsible for education in Iraq.

External links
Iraq Ministry of Education official website

Education
Iraq
Education in Iraq
Educational organizations based in Iraq